Kirovabad can refer to:

 The former name of Ganja, the second largest city in Azerbaijan.
 The former name of Panj or Pyandzh a city in Tajikistan.
 Kirovabad pogrom - pogrom in Kirovabad formerly Ganja.